B'z The Best XXV 1999-2012 is a compilation album by Japanese hard rock duo B'z. It was released on June 12, 2013, simultaneously with B'z The Best XXV 1988-1998, and it is part of their 25th anniversary celebration. It reached #2 at Oricon charts, while B'z The Best XXV 1988-1998 itself reached the top, the same happening at the Billboard Japan Top Albums.

The album track listing is composed of several singles released by the band, and features two new tracks: "Yūtopia" and "Q&A", the first being used as the opening theme of TV Asahi's Doctors 〜最強の名医〜, while the latter is being used as the opening theme of Yomiuri TV's Detective Conan.

Track listing

Disc 1 
  - 3:59
  - 4:13
 "May" - 4:19
 "Juice" - 4:02
 "Ring" - 3:59
 "Ultra Soul" - 3:43
 "Gold" - 5:36
  - 4:05
 "It's Showtime!!" - 4:00
  - 4:39
 "Banzai" - 3:51
 "Arigato" - 4:59
  - 4:22
 "Ocean" - 5:29

Disc 2 
  - 3:18
  - 4:38
 "Splash!" - 3:34
  - 5:11
 "Super Love Song" - 4:00
  - 3:52
  - 4:12
 "Dive" - 3:00
 "My Lonely Town" - 3:38
  - 3:43
 "Don't Wanna Lie" - 4:06
  - 4:41
 "Q&A" - (new song)
  (new song) - 4:24

Certifications

References

External links
Album at B'z official website

B'z compilation albums
2013 compilation albums